A Cure for Pokeritis is a 1912 short silent film starring John Bunny and Flora Finch. After Bunny's death in 1915, a re-release was announced with the alternative title A Sure Cure for Pokeritis. The film, a domestic comedy, depicts a woman who stops her husband's gambling habit by having her cousin stage a fake police raid on his weekly poker game. It was one of many similar shorts produced by Vitagraph Studios—one-reel comedies starring Bunny and Finch in a domestic setting, known popularly as "Bunnygraphs" or "Bunnyfinches"—whose popularity made Bunny and Finch early film stars. The film has been recognized as an historically important representative of its period and genre.

Plot 
Upon returning home from an evening spent losing at poker, George Brown swears off gambling forever. However, his friend Bigelow convinces him to secretly continue attending the weekly poker game and to tell his wife Mary that he has been admitted to the Sons of the Morning, a fraternal lodge, to explain his absences. When George sleep-talks, she becomes suspicious and has her cousin Freddie Dewdrop follow him, allowing her to learn the truth. Together with the wives of the other poker players, she enacts a plan to end the gambling. Freddie and the members of his Bible study group dress up as police officers and raid the game. The gamblers' wives then arrive, and the "police" leave the men to be scolded, purportedly in place of being arrested. As the film ends, the Browns reconcile.

Cast 
It is not entirely clear what the names of the characters played by Bunny and Finch were intended to be. In the film, the letter written to gather the wives together identifies the two main characters as Mary and George Brown. However, a cast list in Vitagraph's in-house publication refers to the main characters as Mr. and Mrs. Bunny Sharpe, while "Mr. Brown" is given as the name of a minor character.

 John Bunny as Mr. Bunny Sharpe / George Brown
 Flora Finch as Mrs. Bunny Sharpe / Mary Brown
 Charles Eldridge as Bunny's friend Bigelow
 Harold Wilson as another friend
 Rose Tapley as Bigelow's wife
 Leah Baird as another friend's wife
 Harry T. Morey as Freddie Dewdrop
 Tom Powers as Freddie's chum
 James Morrison as Freddie's chum
 William R. Dunn as Mr. Brown
 Arthur Rosson as the costumer

Production 

A Cure for Pokeritis was one of many Vitagraph's one-reel or shorter comedies starring Bunny and Finch in a domestic setting, known popularly as "Bunnygraphs" or "Bunnyfinches". The number of these shorts that were originally produced is unknown because Vitagraph's films were generally not archived. Estimates vary considerably; totals in excess of 150, 200, or 260 have been proposed. Most of the studio's films are now considered lost.

The film was an early example of efforts to move beyond theater blocking conventions. During the police raid, depth was demonstrated by having action take place in both the foreground and the background, and by allowing actors to move between the spaces. This cinematography technique lent realism to the scene, and improved its pacing.

Exhibition 
In the silent era, movies were accompanied by a variety of live and recorded music. Depending on the film and the venue, the music might have been the performance of a live pianist or orchestra, recorded music, or absent entirely. Some pictures were distributed with cue sheets indicating when music was to be played, or anthologies of specific songs to use as accompaniment. Especially between 1910 and 1912, these selections were often popular music, chosen because the song's title or lyrics related to the film in some way, in contrast to later efforts to provide music with appropriate texture. Beginning in 1910, Vitagraph provided lists of this nature for all of their films.

Music 
Vitagraph's recommended music for A Cure for Pokeritis began with "I'm Glad I'm Married" and "I've Got My Eyes on You". The studio suggested either "I Don't Believe You" or "I'm an Honorary Member of the Patsy Club" be played as George presented his purported lodge membership. His sleep-talking was to be accompanied by "If You Talk in Your Sleep, Don't Mention My Name", followed by "Back to the Factory, Mary" as Freddie investigates. "Whoops, My Dear" was to score the police raid, and "Don't Take Me Home" would play as the film ended.

Reception and legacy 
The Bunnygraphs, as a genre, were representative of the cinema of the period, and were very successful, making Bunny the first American comic film star and Finch the first female star comedian. A Cure for Pokeritis, released February 23, 1912, was individually well-received, including in showings outside the United States. The Thames Star, a New Zealand newspaper, described the film as "screamingly funny". After John Bunny's death, interest in his films led Vitagraph in 1917 to announce the re-release of this film (retitled A Sure Cure for Pokeritis), along with many of his other works, as "Favorite Film Features". However, the comedy style of A Cure for Pokeritis has not aged well, especially in contrast to Mack Sennett's slapstick films and the works of later comedians such as Charlie Chaplin and Buster Keaton. According to film scholars Donald McCaffrey and Christopher Jacobs, modern viewers "will hardly get a flicker of a smile" from the film, despite the skill of its actors.

The film's themes and its relationship to later works have been the subject of critical analysis. A Cure for Pokeritis may be the first depiction of poker in film, and provides insight into the public's perception of the game at the time as a male-dominated societal ill.  This attitude, and a scene similar to the film's plot, is also present in Cassius Marcellus Coolidge's painting Sitting up with a Sick Friend, part of the Dogs Playing Poker series commissioned in 1903. A Cure for Pokeritis has been compared to sitcoms of both the 1940s and the end of the 20th century. Film historian Wes Gehring of Ball State University considers George to be a forerunner of the modern antihero archetype and compares the Browns to Laurel and Hardy. Other authors have examined the film's gender issues. Gerald Mast wrote that the comedic aspects overlaid a conflict between masculinity and moralist or feminist values. Brunel University lecturer Geoff King viewed the male lead's efforts to escape from an "imprisoning" wife to be a recurring theme in silent comedy, and film reviewer Peter Nash found the "fastidious and effeminate" Freddie an example of a contemporary gay stock character.

In 2011, this film was selected for preservation in the United States National Film Registry by the Library of Congress as being a "culturally, historically, or aesthetically significant" representative of the Bunnygraph films.

Home media 
A Cure for Pokeritis is in the public domain and so is widely available, including online. In 1998, Kino International included it in Slapstick Encyclopedia, an eight-volume VHS collection of silent films that was re-released in 2002 as a five-disc DVD collection by Image Entertainment.

Notes

References

Bibliography

External links
A Cure for Pokeritis – essay by Steve Massa on the National Film Registry website

1912 comedy films
1912 films
American black-and-white films
Silent American comedy films
American silent short films
Articles containing video clips
Films directed by Laurence Trimble
Films about poker
United States National Film Registry films
Vitagraph Studios short films
1912 short films
1910s American films